Rocío Aguilar Montoya (born 14 December 1956) is a Costa Rican politician. She was the eleventh Comptroller General of the Republic of Costa Rica (2005-2012). Between May 2018 and October 2019, she was the Minister of Finance.

Biography
Aguilar was born in Escazú on 14 December 1956, the daughter of Gilda María Montoya Alvarado and José Joaquín Aguilar Monge. She is married to the civil engineer Rómulo Picado Chacón and is the mother of three children, Ana Cristina Bolaños Aguilar and Gabriela and David Picado Aguilar.

Aguilar obtained a Bachelor of Business Administration with an emphasis in finance and banking at the University of Costa Rica (1975-1981). She received a law degree from the Universidad Escuela Libre de Derecho (1990-2000).

Aguilar is an Administrator and Lawyer by profession, with extensive experience in the financial sector. She was elected as Comptroller General of the Republic of Costa Rica on 28 June 2005. She was sworn in by the Plenary of the Legislative Assembly on 5 July 2005, replacing Dr. Alex Solís Fallas, who was dismissed by the Legislative Assembly on 13 December 2004. Aguilar completed the period for which Dr. Solís Fallas was appointed, which ended on 8 June 2012.

Aguilar has been criticized for her role in leading policy changes to Costa Rica pension funds at SUPEN. These policies opened the pension funds to speculative investments that resulted in millions of losses for the Costa Rican worker class.

References

1956 births
Living people
Costa Rican women lawyers
20th-century Costa Rican lawyers
Women government ministers of Costa Rica
University of Costa Rica alumni
People from Escazú (canton)
21st-century Costa Rican lawyers
21st-century women lawyers
Finance ministers of Costa Rica
21st-century Costa Rican women politicians
Female finance ministers